Tephritis carmen is a species of tephritid or fruit flies in the genus Tephritis of the family Tephritidae.

Distribution
Belgium, Austria & Ukraine South to Spain, Italy & Bulgaria.

References

Tephritinae
Insects described in 1937
Diptera of Europe